Ketchum Sun Valley Historical Society Heritage & Ski Museum (also known as the Sun Valley Museum of History) is the official museum of Ketchum Sun Valley located in Ketchum, Idaho. Founded in 1995, it has collections in skiing, mining Sun Valley, sheep, and Hemingway. Additionally, it contains an archive of documents and Historical photographs.

The Mission statement for the Museum is:
The Ketchum Sun Valley Historical Society Heritage & Ski Museum is dedicated to preserving and interpreting the cultural, recreational, social, natural, economic and environmental heritage of the Wood River Valley and its surrounding areas.

References

External links 
 Ketchum Sun Valley Historical Society Heritage & Ski Museum
 Facebook Page

History museums in Idaho
Museums in Ketchum, Idaho
Ski areas and resorts in Idaho
Skiing organizations
Sports in Idaho
Sports museums in Idaho